Plyustchiella is a genus of moths in the family Cossidae. It contains only one species, Plyustchiella gracilis, which is found in south-eastern Uzbekistan and Turkmenistan. The habitat consists of deserts.

The length of the forewings is 9–13 mm for males and 13–14 mm for females. The forewings have a white or grey submarginal area and a wide brown field in the postdiscal and discal area. The hindwings are brown, with a white basal area. Adults are on wing from April to July.

Etymology
The genus is named in honour of Dr. Igor G. Plyustch.

References

Natural History Museum Lepidoptera generic names catalog

Cossinae
Moths described in 1887